Tiger Kloof Combined School is a school near Vryburg, South Africa.

Tiger Kloof had its origins in the Moffat Institute at Kuruman, part of the educational endeavours of the London Missionary Society in that part of South Africa. When the Moffat Institute closed it was reincarnated, in 1905, as the Tiger Kloof Institute, situated south of Vryburg. Tiger Kloof was a high school, teachers' training college, Bible college and trade school all rolled into one.

The introduction of Bantu Education and the Group Areas Act under Apartheid during the 1950s, however, sounded the death knell for the London Missionary Society's educational efforts here and in the Northern Cape. Tiger Kloof was closed down, but not before its pupils had risen in protest at the new legislation.

In the late 1980s provincial heritage site status was given to the empty shell of the abandoned Tiger Kloof Institute. Built in 1905, and described as a "symphony in stone", Tiger Kloof has since been restored and re-opened as a school.

Notable alumni
Two future Presidents of Botswana, Sir Seretse Khama and Dr Quett Masire, began their studies there. Nakatindi Yeta Nganga, one of the first female MPs in Zambia, also attended the school.

References

External links
 School homepage

Round Square schools
Schools in North West (South African province)